Ronald Reedy is an American businessman, scientist and researcher. In the semiconductor industry, he advanced silicon on sapphire (SOS) and CMOS technology.

Education 

In 1969, Reedy graduated from the United States Naval Academy in Annapolis with a BSEE. He then earned a MSEE degree from Naval Postgraduate School in Monterey. In 1983, he received his Ph.D. in EE & Applied Physics from UC San Diego.

Career 

Reedy began his career at the NOSC (US Naval Ocean Systems Center) where he worked on silicon CMOS processing. In 1988, Reedy along with NOSC colleagues Mark Burgener and Graham Garcia published a research paper in IEEE Electron Device Letters that proved that SOS films thinned to 100 nm were suitable for application to high-performance down-scaled CMOS circuitry. It was with this advancement that Reedy decided to commercialize the technology. Their research findings were instrumental to the industry and have since been cited in 13 IEEE research papers and 58 patents.

In 1990, Reedy co-founded Peregrine Semiconductor to commercialize the advanced technology. Peregrine became a fabless chip designer that was publicly traded on the NASDAQ until the company was acquired by Murata in December 2014 for $471 million. Reedy served as the company's founding CEO and the company's CTO  before retiring in early 2015. Reedy now holds the title of CTO emeritus of Peregrine Semiconductor.

Reedy sits on the Council of Advisors for UCSD's Jacobs School of Engineering and its Gordon Leadership Center.

Over the course of his career, Reedy has been listed as an inventor on dozens of patents. Many of those patents are related to advancements in silicon on insulator, silicon on sapphire and CMOS.

Awards and recognition 

In 2011, Reedy and co-founder Mark Burgener were awarded the IEEE Daniel E. Noble Award for Emerging Technologies for their contribution"to make silicon on sapphire (SOS) technology commercially feasible for wireless communications." The IEEE Noble award is presented annually to individuals who made a significant contribution to emerging technologies.

See also 

Peregrine Semiconductor
Silicon on sapphire

References

External links
UCSD Gordon Center Ron Reedy speaking at the Gordon Engineering Leadership Forum

Year of birth missing (living people)
Living people
American electrical engineers
United States Naval Academy alumni
University of California, San Diego alumni
Naval Postgraduate School alumni
Engineers from California